Garad Saleban Garad Mohamed (Somali: Garaad Saleebaan Garaad Maxamed) was a Somali clan leader. He was the supreme Garad of the Mohamoud Garad and the second most senior traditional leader of the Dhulbahante clan.

Overview
Garad Salebaan was a prominent and influential traditional leader. He was a founding figure of Puntland in 1998, and also of Khaatumo in 2012 after becoming disillusioned with the administration in Puntland. He has since returned to Puntland as a staunch ally of the regime. He has consistently remained opposed to Somaliland's presence in the Dhulbahante inhabited regions of Sool, Sanaag and Cayn. He has described the Puntland process of choosing legislators as corrupt, and that the Puntland administration regularly rescinds officials chosen by him.

On November 18, 2022, Garad Salebaan died in Garowe, Puntland.

Maxamuud Garaad

Gogosha Yagoori
Intermittently, the gogosha Yagoori, a law or peace-making initiative meaning the mattress of Yagoori is set; this occurs during law-making initiatives between  subclans or factions of the Maxamuud garaad, typically in the town of Yagoori.

See also
Dhulbahante
Garad Jama Garad Ali
Garad Abdiqani Garad Jama
Mohamoud Garad
Sool, Somalia
Khaatumo

References

20th-century births
2022 deaths
Ethnic Somali people
Somalian faction leaders
Year of birth missing
Dhulbahante